The 1972 Newfoundland general election was held on 24 March 1972 to elect members of the 36th General Assembly of Newfoundland. It was won by the Progressive Conservative party. In the district of Labrador South, the election was a virtual tie between two candidates and had to be declared void. In a subsequent by-election, the seat was taken by a member of the Labrador Party.

Results

Members elected
For complete electoral history, see individual districts

References
 

Elections in Newfoundland and Labrador
1972 elections in Canada
1972 in Newfoundland and Labrador
March 1972 events in Canada